José Carlos Gonçalves Rodrigues (Greek: Ζοζέ Κάρλος Γκονσάλβες Ροντρίγκες; born 31 August 1988), commonly known as Zeca, is a professional footballer who plays as a midfielder and captains Danish club F.C. Copenhagen, and the Greece national team.

He spent most of his career in Greece with Panathinaikos after starting out at Casa Pia, appearing in more than 200 competitive matches for the former club and winning the 2014 Greek Cup. In 2017, he signed with Copenhagen.

Born in Portugal, Zeca became a Greek citizen in March 2017 and started representing its national team the same year.

Club career

Vitória Setúbal
Born in Lisbon, Zeca started his career with local Casa Pia AC, joining the club's youth system at the age of 10 and promoting to the fourth division in his first season as a senior. In summer 2010 he moved straight into the Primeira Liga, signing with Vitória de Setúbal.

During his first and only season with the Sado River team, Zeca made 26 league appearances, appearing in as many games as a starter or a substitute and totalling 1,611 minutes of action.

Panathinaikos
Zeca signed a four-year contract with Greek side Panathinaikos F.C. on 29 July 2011 for a fee of €400,000, as the club was coached by countryman Jesualdo Ferreira. He played all 30 league games in 2012–13, but the Clover could only finish in sixth place. After a massive rebuilding for the following campaign, he was one of the few survivors.

After more than 100 appearances with the club, on 26 April 2014 Zeca lifted the Greek Cup as team captain, in a final against PAOK FC at the Olympic Stadium in Athens. On 21 June, he signed a three-year extension.

In February 2015, Zeca expressed his desire to play for the Greece national team if he was awarded the country's citizenship. He agreed to renew his contract until 2018 two months later, commenting on the deal: "It will be good to continue with Anastasiou in charge. ... The team is happy and I think we can do a lot better under him".

On 6 February 2016, Andrea Stramaccioni's team ended the match with ten players as Zeca was shown a straight red card in a 0–1 home loss against Skoda Xanthi FC. Eight days later, after returning from suspension, he again received his marching orders, but in an eventual 3–0 away victory over PAS Giannina FC.

Zeca extended his contract on 9 August 2016, until the summer of 2019 for an undisclosed fee.

Copenhagen
On 28 August 2017, Panathinaikos reached a formal agreement with F.C. Copenhagen for Zeca's transfer to the Danish club, for a fee believed to be in the region of €1.5 million; the player signed a four-year deal, with an annual salary of €1 million. On his debut, on 9 September, he scored in a 4–3 home defeat of FC Midtjylland.

On 6 November 2019, after helping the team win the Superliga for the fifth time in the decade, Zeca renewed his contract until 30 June 2023. On 3 October 2021, he suffered a cruciate ligament injury in a game against Viborg FF that sidelined him for several months; he still contributed relatively as they conquered the domestic league again.

Zeca was again seriously injured in the knee in October 2022.

International career
Having completed five years of residence and professional status in Greece, Zeca became eligible for its citizenship in the beginning of 2017. He passed the relevant language and history exams in November 2016, becoming available for national side manager Michael Skibbe in the middle of the 2018 FIFA World Cup qualification campaign. He earned his first cap on 25 March 2017, coming on as a late substitute in a 1–1 away draw against Belgium; in the return match, on 3 September of that year, he scored his first goal in a 1–2 loss in Piraeus.

Career statistics

Club

(* Includes UEFA Champions League, UEFA Europa League and UEFA Europa Conference League)

(** Includes Taça da Liga and Greek Playoffs)

International

 Scores and results list Greece's goal tally first, score column indicates score after each Zeca goal.

Honours
Panathinaikos
Greek Football Cup: 2013–14

Copenhagen
Danish Superliga: 2018–19, 2021–22

Individual
Super League Greece Team of the Year: 2014–15, 2015–16
Danish Superliga Player of the Season: 2019
Copenhagen Player of the Season: 2019–20, 2020–21

References

External links

1988 births
Living people
Greek people of Portuguese descent
Naturalized citizens of Greece
Portuguese footballers
Greek footballers
Footballers from Lisbon
Association football midfielders
Primeira Liga players
Casa Pia A.C. players
Vitória F.C. players
Super League Greece players
Panathinaikos F.C. players
Danish Superliga players
F.C. Copenhagen players
Portugal youth international footballers
Greece international footballers
Portuguese expatriate footballers
Greek expatriate footballers
Expatriate footballers in Greece
Expatriate men's footballers in Denmark
Portuguese expatriate sportspeople in Greece
Portuguese expatriate sportspeople in Denmark
Greek expatriate sportspeople in Denmark